All Ladakh Gonpa Association is the central organisation of the Buddhist monasteries in Ladakh, India. It aims to preserve and strengthen the monastic institutions. It was founded by the 19th Kushok Bakula Rinpoche in 1949 and he acted as its president for 41 years, from 1949 until 1991. In 1949, the first meeting of the great monasteries was held and ten monasteries took part. All Ladakh Gonpa Association was registered in 1959 and is run by a governing body consisting of fifteen lama members belonging to all four major schools of Tibetan Buddhism. There are sixteen major monastic institutions with hundreds of monks in each monastery.

References

Buddhist monasteries in Ladakh
1949 establishments in India
Organisations based in Ladakh